Erin Jessica Cahill (born January 4, 1980) is an American actress. She is best known for her roles as Jen Scotts in Power Rangers Time Force, Ted Mosby's sister Heather in How I Met Your Mother, and Kendra Burke in Saving Grace. She had a recurring role as Felicity in the ABC series Red Widow. She is also noted to be the first lead female character for the Call of Duty franchise, as Chloe 'Karma' Lynch in Call of Duty: Black Ops II and Rebecca Chambers in Resident Evil: Vendetta. Since 2016, Cahill has worked primarily in television movies for Lifetime and Hallmark.

Early life
Cahill was born in Stafford, Virginia. She began acting in her mother's local high school productions at age four, and started singing and dancing lessons at age eight. She was Miss Pre-Teen Virginia in 1991 and the first runner-up for Miss Junior America. She continued to act into her high school years at Brooke Point High School, where she served as the president of many clubs, including the Honor Thespians group. As a junior, Cahill was the only one of her year to garner perfect scores in all phases of her audition to the Governor's School for the Arts in drama. At age 16, she also won Overall Actor in the Actors, Models, Talent for Christ competition. She was further selected into the Barton and Williams Dance Company, winning both company and individual awards. Following high school graduation in 1998, she attended Marymount Manhattan College in New York on an academic and performing arts scholarship. She left college at age 19 to pursue a full-time acting career in Los Angeles.

Career 
Cahill was cast as Jen Scotts, the Pink Time Force Ranger, in Power Rangers Time Force. She started her guest starring roles in 2003 with Crossing Jordan and General Hospital. In 2006, she starred in the short-lived Fox series Free Ride. Her first big guest star came the following year in 2007 as a 20th-century suffragette in the Cold Case episode "Torn". Since then, she has worked in numerous films and television shows such as Supernatural, CSI: Miami, The Mentalist, Castle, Ghost Whisperer, Grey's Anatomy, and House. She has appeared in commercials for Bank of America, TJ Maxx, Hyundai, Applebee's, Redfin, Tampax, Lean Cuisine, Honda, and Land Rover Discovery Sport.

In 2013, Cahill's projects included the short film The Ventriloquist, voice and motion-capture credits as Chloe "Karma" Lynch in Call of Duty: Black Ops II, and a guest role as Lena Gilbert in FOX's Sleepy Hollow.

The following year, Cahill guest-starred on NCIS: Los Angeles and made a brief appearance on Garfunkel and Oates.

Cahill's international commercial for Land Rover Discovery Sport ran in 2015.  She has also appeared in commercials for Redfin.

Charity work
Cahill co-founded Charitable Living, which services the local community with fundraisers and days of volunteering. In May 2015, Cahill joined non-profit group BuildOn and traveled to Malawi to promote education and build schools.

Personal life
In September 2016, Cahill married Welsh musician Paul Freeman in a ceremony on the Cote d'Azur, France.

Filmography

Film

Television

Video games

References

External links 

20th-century American actresses
21st-century American actresses
Actresses from Virginia
American film actresses
American television actresses
American video game actresses
American voice actresses
Living people
Marymount Manhattan College alumni
People from Calabasas, California
People from Stafford, Virginia
1980 births